Romain Maes (10 August 1913 – 22 February 1983) was a Belgian cyclist who won the 1935 Tour de France after wearing the yellow jersey of leadership from beginning to end. Maes was the 13th child in his family. He started racing when he was 17. He turned professional in 1933 and won the Omloop van het Westen (Tour of the West). The following year he started the Tour de France and twice finished stages in second place. He then crashed on the day from Digne to Nice and left the race in an ambulance.

His win in 1935 ended a six-year run by French riders. He became a hero in Belgium.

He won the 1936 Paris–Roubaix but wasn't given the victory. The judge said he had seen the Frenchman, Georges Speicher, win. In 1938 he was well on the way to winning Paris-Brussels, leading the race by 100m with only 500m to go. He rode into the velodrome on which the race finished, crossed the line and stopped. The chasers, who had remembered that there was a further lap to ride, swept by him. Maes realised his mistake too late and Marcel Kint won.

Maes started the Tour de France in 1939 and won the stage from Caen to Vire, a time trial over 63 km. It gave him the lead. Then he crashed on the eighth stage and abandoned the race.

Maes rode on the track for several years with his namesake, Sylvère Maes, to whom he wasn't related.

Romain Maes stopped racing in 1944 and opened a bar, "In de Gele Trui" (In The Yellow Jersey), near the North station in Brussels.

Career achievements

Major results

1933
Stekene
1934
Wevelgem
1935
Paris - Lille
Tour de France:
 Winner overall classification
Winner stages 1, 11 and 21
Tournai
1936
Circuit de Paris
1939
Omloop der Vlaamse Gewesten
Tour de France:
Winner stage 2A

Grand Tour results timeline

References

External links 

Official Tour de France results for Romain Maes

Belgian male cyclists
Tour de France winners
Belgian Tour de France stage winners
1913 births
1983 deaths
Cyclists from West Flanders
People from Jabbeke